Grums is a locality and the seat of Grums Municipality, Värmland County, Sweden with 5,025 inhabitants in 2010.

References 

Populated places in Värmland County
Populated places in Grums Municipality
Municipal seats of Värmland County
Swedish municipal seats